The Diocese of Argyll was an ecclesiastical territory or diocese of Scotland in the Middle Ages. The Diocese was led by the Bishop of Argyll, and was based at Lismore.

During the Scottish Reformation, the majority of the Scottish established church broke communion with the Pope. The establishment oscillated for a number of years over the question of whether to retain the order of bishops as leaders in the church, as the Church of England had done. Eventually the presbyterians, those who do not have bishops, became the majority of the establishment and the post-Reformation Church of Scotland. However, the Scottish Episcopal Church continued to appoint bishops for the ancient dioceses of Scotland. In 1688, the diocese was held with the Diocese of Ross because of a shortage of bishops in the Episcopal Church. This union often included the dioceses of Moray or Caithness through the 17th and 18th centuries. In 1819, the ancient Diocese of the Isles was added, and, in 1847, Alexander Ewing became the first Bishop of Argyll and the Isles. In 1878, the Roman Catholic Church founded a new diocese of the same name. Both the Episcopal and Catholic dioceses are now based in Oban.

Medieval parishes 
Source:

Deanery of Glassary 

 Craignish
 Dunoon
 Inveraray
 Inverchaolain
 Kilfinan
 Kilmartin
 Kilmichael Inverlussa
 Kilmodan
 Kilmorich
 Kilmun
 Lochgoilhead
 Strachur or Kilmaghlas
 Strathlachlan

Deanery of Kintyre 

 Kilberry
 Kilblane
 Kilchalmonell
 Kilchenzie
 Kilchousland
 Kilcolmkill
 Kilkerran
 Kilkivan
 Killarrow
 Killean
 Kilmichael
 North Knapdale or Kilmacocharmik

Deanery of Lorn 

 Ardchattan
 Glenorchy
 Inishail
 Kilbrandon (Isle of Seil)
 Kilbride
 Kilchattan (Isle of Luing)
 Kilchrenan
 Killespick-Kyril
 Kilmelfort
 Kilmore
 Kilninver
 Lismore & Appin (Cathedral)

Deanery of Morvern 

 Ardnamurchan
 Arisaig
 Eilean Fhianain
 Eilean Munde or Glencoe
 Glenelg
 Killintag
 Kilmallie
 Kilmonivaig
 Knoydart
 Moidart
 Morvern

References

External links
Diocese of Argyll and the Isles
GCatholic.org

Pre-Reformation dioceses of Scotland
Religion in Oban
Religion in Argyll and Bute

it:Diocesi di Argyll